The Manuscript is a My Dying Bride EP released on 13 May 2013 on CD and vinyl. It contains four tracks, three of which were recorded at the same time as the band's previous album, A Map of All Our Failures.

Background
Speaking to Metal Forces magazine, vocalist Aaron Stainthorpe said, "[the songs are] very similar to 'A Map of All Our Failures', because they were written and recorded at the same time, except for one song. That really stands out… [laughs] It's full-on sort of epic death metal; it's swords and axes, a proper warrior battle kind of track that's almost medieval in flavor. You can almost picture the scene; it's set in a snowy kind of mountainous landscape. There are sound effects and all sorts of mayhem going on in it, and death metal vocals not quite all the way through it, but near enough. It even has a Swedish title which because my Swedish isn't great, I'm not gonna repeat here. [laughs] I need to get the pronunciation right before I do that."

The album's title track was made available to stream from SoundCloud by Terrorizer magazine. Stainthorpe has announced that a music video for the title track is being produced.

Track listing

Personnel

My Dying Bride
 Aaron Stainthorpe – lead vocals
 Andrew Craighan – guitar 
 Hamish Glencross – guitar 
 Lena Abé – bass 
 Shaun MacGowan – violin, keyboards

Additional musicians
Shaun Taylor Steels – drums

References

My Dying Bride EPs
2013 EPs